Fin.K.L is a South Korean girl group formed by DSP Media in 1998 consisting of members Lee Hyori, Ock Joo-hyun, Lee Jin, and Sung Yu-ri. Fin.K.L was one of the most popular K-pop groups of the late 1990s and early 2000s, alongside rival girl group S.E.S. The group cemented their popularity in South Korea with the release the songs "To My Boyfriend" in 1998, "Forever Love" in 1999, and "Now" in 2000.

The group released four full-length albums: Blue Rain (1998), White (1999), Now (2000), and Eternity (2002). They won several major awards including New Artist of the Year at the 1998 Golden Disc Awards, the Grand Prize at the 1999 Seoul Music Awards, and Best Female Group at the 2000 Mnet Music Video Festival.

Fin.K.L became inactive after releasing the single, "Fine Killing Liberty", in 2005. However, Fin.K.L reunited on a variety show in July 2019 and released Fin.K.L Best Album, including a new song titled "남아있는 노래처럼 (Just Like The Song That Remains)" on September 22.

Name 
Their name stands for Fin Killing Liberty, and was intended to mean that the group stood against "the oppression of all freedom" (fin means "end" in Spanish and French). The group's name was selected by a poll of young people by the record company before the group's inception. This is the reason for the lack of clear meaning in Fin.K.L's English name, for the Korean name was selected first.

History

1998: Formation and debut 
The first member to be discovered for Fin.K.L was its lead singer, Ock Joo-hyun. She was discovered through a radio singing contest, which she won by singing Mariah Carey's 1993 hit "Hero". Ock told her friend Lee Jin about this group and encouraged her to join; Lee was selected after singing Eco's "Blessed Me" for her audition. The next member to be selected was Sung Yu-ri, who was discovered while on a school field trip. As for the fourth member, Annie Lee (who formed Tashannie with Yoon Mi-rae) was accepted, but decided to depart after a few months. Lee Hyori, who was found while in a mall taking sticker pictures with friends, was brought into the group.

Fin.K.L debuted in 1998 with its first album Blue Rain. The trend of late 1990s K-pop was to have groups sing cute, catchy music, as evidenced by the success of SM Entertainment groups S.E.S. and H.O.T. In contrast, Fin.K.L's initial strength was in R&B ballads led by Ock's vocals; this was shown by their first single "Blue Rain". Fin.K.L's next hit "To My Boyfriend" was a more typical pop song and followed popular conventions at the time. (Yuki Hsu, a Taiwanese singer, sang a remake version of "To My Boyfriend" not long after the song's success in South Korea.) They capped off their first album activities with a third single, "Sad Tears", which was a ballad about a lost love, and giving that love up for the good of everyone involved. The group also created a music video for a fourth single (which was eventually just left as a video and not promoted).

1999: White and S.P.E.C.I.A.L 
Fin.K.L released a follow-up album on May 13, 1999, with White. Two hit songs from this album were "Forever Love" and "Pride. Their second album had less of a focus on ballads, although the slow R&B song "Waiting for You" was performed occasionally. Also, Fin.K.L began limiting their music videos to one or two per album; a video was never made for "Waiting for You". Like their first, this album was very successful, selling almost 700,000 copies.

The group released a "decimalized" or "half" album (which usually signifies either a limited or special release, such as a cover album or a themed record). Their first "half" album was released on November 24, 1999, and their two most famous songs from this album were "To My Prince", a ballad, and "White", a seasonal pop song. S.P.E.C.I.A.L also contained a remake version of "Like an Indian Doll", a popular song sung by Na-mi (나미) in 1989. No music videos were made in support of the album's release. The album sold in excess of 340,000 copies.

Because of its release date, Fin.K.L created a "winter" theme for their performances and dressed in wintry outfits to promote "White". To complete the theme, they often had fake snow falling during their "White" performances; however, this created a problem in that the snow was quite slippery, causing members and back-up dancers to slip and even occasionally fall. Due to the limited release of the album, Fin.K.L has a shorter promotion schedule. However, both of these 1999 albums helped Fin.K.L win a daesang (Korean for 'grand prize') at the end of the year.

2000–2001: Now and Melodies & Memories 
Fin.K.L's third album Now, released on October 6, 2000, emphasized the physical maturity of Fin.K.L members. Unlike the previous catchy tunes and cute outfits, Fin.K.L members were dressed in semi-formal attire for performances for the hit single "Now" (the album's title song). "Feel Your Love", their follow-up single, had their members in school uniforms that signified transformation to womanhood. Only "Now" was promoted with a music video and a busy performance schedule; the second single was relatively ignored. The album sold over 400,000 copies.

The group released their second "half" album on April 13, 2001, 6 months after their last album. Melodies & Memories was a special album consisting of remakes of Korean hits from the 80s and 90s. Instead of targeting their main fanbase of teenage listeners, this album appealed to adults in their 20s and 30s by arousing nostalgia. Singles from this album include Lee Ye-rin's "Always Like This Moment", and Hye Eun-yi's 1981 single "You Wouldn't Know". Like their third album, Memories & Melodies only had one music video promoting the album (the one for "You Wouldn't Know"). However, much effort went into this video, as it recreated scenes from four popular movies for each of the members, including scenes from Pretty Woman. Sales at the end of 2001 totaled 259,259 copies.

In 2000, they also recorded "True Love" for a South Korean drama, All About Eve.

2002: Eternity 
Their last studio album so far was released in the spring of 2002. The first single, "Forever", was a depressing ballad about waiting forever for a lost love. This was accompanied by a video depicting four tragic stories mainly about the loss of innocence: Sung portrays a prostitute, Ock a sick housewife, Lee Jin a moody artist who eventually kills herself, and Lee Hyori as a boxer who loses a finger. This song became very popular, although it was not as heavily promoted as their other lead singles. Their second single, "Don't Go Away", was chosen by the fans via the group's website, because it was felt that Fin.K.L had not had an upbeat single for a while. However, this single was promoted for a short time before being abruptly dropped. By the end of 2002, the album sold 261,518 copies.

2003–2006: Solo activities, "Fine Killing Liberty" and indefinite hiatus 
Fin.K.L decided to go their separate ways, although not officially breaking up. Lee Hyori and Ock have since released solo albums, while Lee Jin and Sung have acted in dramas and hosted various shows. At the end of 2005, the group made a comeback and released "Fine Killing Liberty", a digital single that had 4 songs (including the title track) and a music video. However, due to lack of promotion (as the group did not perform on the various music shows), the single failed to chart. Instead of ignoring the single, though, they have since released a special Fin.K.L Forever set that had two DVDs (one with their music videos and the other with various performances) and a photobook that also had the "Fine Killing Liberty" single in CD form.

They have continued to work in the entertainment industry and stay in the public eye. Sung has continued acting, starting with the drama Bad Girls and receiving positive attention in 2003 for Thousand Years of Love. Sung also played the lead roles in the dramas My Platoon Leader and First Love of a Royal Prince. She was also in the drama series, One Fine Day and The Snow Queen, she received high praise and won awards for both performances in 2006. Sung also starred as Heo Yi-nok in the drama Hong Gil-dong co-starring Kang Ji-hwan and won a Best Couple award. Lee Jin has also worked in television, hosting various shows and even joining a popular comedy show for a season. Both Sung and Lee Jin won "Best Actress" in their respective categories (drama and comedy) at the end-of-year awards in 2002. Lee Jin has also debuted in the South Korean film industry and has tried to distance herself from her Fin.K.L image.

After her solo album "Nan..." in 2003, due to significant weight loss, Ock became very popular in 2004. She debuted as a musical actress in 2005 in "Aida", and after initial struggles has since went on to become one of the highest profile musical actresses in Korea with ticketing power rivaling her male counterparts, having starred in the Korean-language adaptations of Rebecca, Elisabeth, The Count of Monte Cristo, Wicked, Sweeney Todd, Chicago, original musical Mata Hari, and many more. Her third and last studio album, Remind, came out in 2007, she has since released OSTs and independent ballads. Lee Hyori, though, has been the standout solo member, releasing her first solo album in 2003 which catapulted her to the top of the charts and won her many advertising contracts. However, she encountered controversy on her second album's lead song "Get Ya!", because it had elements that were very similar to Britney Spears's "Do Somethin'". Although she moved on to her second single "Shall We Dance?", promotional activities were quickly stopped. Her 2007 single "Toc Toc Toc", released in March 2007, reached #1 on the Music Industry Association of South Korea's monthly charts.

By the fall of 2006, all the members of Fin.K.L had left DSP Entertainment and signed on with different companies. Although there was continued speculation on the status of the group, Fin.K.L never officially disbanded.

2008–2019: Reunions and Camping Club 
Fin.K.L reunited and performed together on December 19, 2008, during a concert by Lee Hyori. In September 2010, Ock became the host of the KBS Cool FM music program Gayo Plaza (가요광장). Her program began airing on September 20, 2010, and her first guests were Lee Hyori, Lee Jin, and Sung as members of Fin.K.L.

In May 2019, a Fin.K.L reunion variety show was announced to air on JTBC. The television series, Camping Club, featured the Fin.K.L members reuniting and traveling around the country; the show premiered on July 14.

On September 22, 2019, the group released a single, "남아있는 노래처럼 (Just Like The Song That Remains)," marking their first release since 2005.

Discography

Studio albums

Compilation albums

Extended plays

Singles

Awards and nominations

See also
 List of best-selling girl groups

References

External links

 

K-pop music groups
Musical groups disestablished in 2002
Musical groups established in 1998
Musical groups reestablished in 2005
South Korean girl groups
1998 establishments in South Korea
DSP Media artists
MAMA Award winners
Grand Prize Seoul Music Award recipients